Streblus heterophyllus, commonly known as the small-leaved milk tree, is a species of plant in the family Moraceae that is endemic to New Zealand.

Description

As a juvenile plant, S. heterophyllus has distinctive fiddle-shaped leaves and a divaricating growth pattern.

The small-leaved milk tree flowers from the middle of spring to summer, with red berries following from late spring to autumn.

References

heterophyllus
Flora of New Zealand
Divaricating plants